The Pacific Banana Slug (Ariolimax columbianus) is a species of slug found on the Pacific coast of North America. It is the second-largest species of terrestrial slug in the world, growing up to 25 centimeters (9.8 in) long. As of 2021, it is the most commonly observed species in the genus Ariolimax on the citizen science website iNaturalist. An important function of this particular species is the role it plays in seed dispersion.

Description 
The Pacific Banana Slug can grow up to 25 centimeters long, making it the second largest terrestrial slug in the world. It is often bright yellow, but it can also be greenish, brown, tan, or white. The Pacific Banana Slug commonly also has black spots covering the tail, sometimes so extensively that the tail may appear completely black. Individual slugs can also change color from changes in their environment and eating habits, and can also indicate if a slug is healthy or injured.

Distribution
The Pacific Banana Slug is found from Alaska, United States and British Columbia, Canada in the north down through Idaho, Washington,and Oregon to Southern California, with the highest concentration in California. They are the only species of the genus Ariolimax that is found outside of California. They are found in moist and damp areas of the forest floor.

References

Ariolimacidae
Molluscs of North America
Endemic fauna of the Pacific Northwest